Obafemi Owode is a Local Government Area in Ogun State, Nigeria.

It has an area of 1,410 km² and a population of 228,851 at the 2006 census.

The postal code of the area is 110.

Historical background

Obafemi Owode Local Government is one of the Local Governments that came into existence through Edict No.9 of 1976, resulting from the 1976 Local Government reforms, prior to this period, the administration of the area was carried out by Oba Provincial Authority, Owode District Council and Obafemi District Council.

Obafemi Owode Local Government has its headquarters at Owode Egba.

Boundaries

Obafemi Owode Local Government shares common boundaries with the following Local and State Governments:
 North  - Odeda Local Government and Oyo State
 East  - Sagamu and Ikenne Local Governments
 South - Ifo Local Government and Lagos State

Population and area

Population: Obafemi-Owode Local Government has an estimated population of 230,000.

Land mass: It is made up of about 1,204 towns and villages with a land mass of 104,787.07 hectares of largely agricultural land.

People

Obafemi Owode Local Government is made up of people residing in Adigbe, Oba,  Kobape, Obafemi, Ogunmakin, Ajebo, Owode, Mowe, Ibafo, Iro town and Mokoloki towns and they are mostly Egbas. Therefore the common language being spoken is the Yoruba with the Egba dialect. The traditional institution of the people is predominantly governed by Baales with the exception of a very early settlement called Iro town, Oba Sanusi Ogunrinde Oyero. Eribi IV (Late), followed by other towns like Ibafo, Ofada, Mokoloki, Owode and others during the administration of the former governor of the state Senator Ibikunle Amosun.

Culture

An insight into the cultural aspects of the people reveals that they are blessed with rich Yoruba traditional dances such as Ogodo dance, Egungun and Bolojo dances, in some areas of the Local Government.

Infrastructural development

Obafemi Owode Local Government has some motorable (graded) roads which are linked by state and federal road network for inter and intra city connections.

The Federal roads running through the Local Government area include:  
 Lagos-Ibadan Express way  
 Abeokuta-Sagamu road
 Sagamu-Papalanto road

State roads within the area include:   
 Owode-Siun-Ofada road
 Siun-Iperu road
 Owode-Obafemi road
 Kobape-Oba-Ojere road 
 Idi-Aba-Ajebo road
 Ogunmakin-Ajebo road
 Ofada-Mowe road

Health services
Obafemi Owode Local Government has competent staff and facilities. In all, there are 4 medical doctors and 46 para-medical staffers while there are 22 health clinics and 12 health posts. Both human and material resources are evenly spread all over the health districts. Recently commissioned, are two newly completed health clinics to boost the health projection plan of the Local Government.

Apart from the curative aspect of health, this Local Government attends to the preventive aspect particularly in the area of contagious diseases such as guinea-worm eradication and global 2001 programme. The Rotary Club of Ake, Abeokuta has also given support in this respect.
File:Aerial view of ibafo 3.jpg - Wikimedia Commons

Economic and investment opportunities

Agriculture
Obafemi Owode Local Government is endowed with vast fertile land suitable for the cultivation of rice, kolanut, sugarcane, maize, cassava, tomatoes and a wide variety of vegetables. The Local Government is generally regarded as the land of OFADA rice. The major food crops of the area includes cassava, rice, cocoyam, plantain, maize and vegetable, while palm produced and cocoa form the major cash crops.

Occupation
The people are predominantly farmers, most of whom engage themselves in farming of arable crops. There are also some who engage in livestock and fishing.

In recent times, however, the people of the area engage themselves in Quarry business, artisan works and handcrafts, such as dye making and pottery. The popular adire fabrics are also produced in some areas of the Local Government.

Major markets
The major markets in the area includes the Siun market, Ogunmakin market, Obafemi market, Mokoloki market, Mowe, Ibafo and Owode markets.

Tourism
Obafemi Owode Local Government has within it privately owned hotels for the relaxation and comfort of residents and visitors. Notable among these, are the Owode motel, based in Owode-Egba and the Don-Emilia Royal hotel based in Mowe-Ibafo.

Tourist attractions of the area include the wildlife forest of the area, grass less mountains found in some area and the Youth centre at Ofada town.

Administrative and political divisions

For administrative convenience, Obafemi Owode Local Government is politically divided into 12 wards:

 Mokoloki ward
 Oba ward
 Ofada ward
 Egbeda ward
 Owode ward
 Kajola ward
 Ajura ward
 Obafemi ward
 Moloko Asipa ward
 Ajebo ward
 Onidundu ward
 Alapako-Oni ward

References

Local Government Areas in Ogun State